Esmé Creed-Miles (born 5 February 2000) is an English actress, known for starring as the title character in the Amazon Video series Hanna.

Early life 
Creed-Miles was born in Barnet, England and attended the English boarding school Bedales. She is the daughter of actors Charlie Creed-Miles and Samantha Morton.

Career 
Creed-Miles began her acting career as little Shirley Temple in the film Mister Lonely (2007) directed by Harmony Korine. Her next film appearance came ten years later when she was cast in Clio Barnard's Dark River. In an interview, Creed-Miles said that she had auditioned for roles in several independent films before she was chosen to star as the eponymous character in Hanna. According to the actress she trained in martial arts six hours a day for months as preparation for her fight scenes in the series. Creed-Miles valued how her role as Hanna enabled her to challenge societal norms about gender and sexuality. Creed-Miles has received positive reviews for her work in the series. The Atlantic noted that she is "imbuing the character with emotional vulnerability and physical power. Even more striking is how she communicates Hanna’s intelligence, how fleet and observant and hyperalert she is."

Creed-Miles is also a musician and feminist.

She plays the lead in the 2019 films Pond Life and Undercliffe produced by Open Palm Films.

Filmography

Film

Television

Awards and nominations

References

External links 
 
 

2000 births
Living people
People from the London Borough of Barnet
People educated at Bedales School
21st-century English actresses
English actresses